Virola cuspidata is a species of tree in the family Myristicaceae.

References

cuspidata